Cikampek Station is a large class type B railway station located in Cikampek Kota, Cikampek, Karawang Regency. The station, which is located at an altitude of +46 meters, is the station that is located in the easternmost part of the Jakarta Operational Area I and Karawang Regency, and is the largest railway station in Karawang Regency.

The station is one of the important stations for train travel from Jakarta to various cities on the Java region.

Services
The following is a list of train services at the Cikampek Station.

Passenger services
Mixed class
Economy class
Serayu, to  via 
Local train
Jatiluhur, from and to

Freight services
  via –
  via –––

References

External links
 

karawang Regency
railway stations in West Java